The 1995–96 UEFA Champions League was the 41st season of UEFA's premier European club football tournament, and the fourth since its rebranding as the UEFA Champions League. The tournament was won by Juventus, who beat defending champions Ajax on penalties in the final for their first European Cup since 1985, and their second overall. It was the only Champions League title that Juventus won in the 1990s, despite reaching the next two finals, and one of only three Italian wins in the final, despite there being a Serie A club in every final for seven consecutive years from 1992 to 1998.

It was the first tournament in which three points were awarded for a win instead of two.

Teams
24 teams entered the competition – the national champions of each of the top 24 nations in the UEFA coefficient rankings, including UEFA Champions League holders, Ajax. The national champions of the associations ranked 1–7, plus the title holders, all received a bye to the group stage, while the national champions of the associations ranked 8–24 entered in the qualifying round. The remaining national champions from the associations ranked 25–47 were only allowed to participate in UEFA Cup.

Round and draw dates
The schedule of the competition is as follows (all draws are held in Geneva, Switzerland).

Qualifying round

Dynamo Kyiv won their tie against Aalborg BK, but, in their first group game against Panathinaikos, they were accused of a failed attempt to bribe the referee, Antonio López Nieto, to get a win. Despite an appeal, they were ejected from the competition and banned for two years, with Aalborg BK replacing them in the group stage. Dynamo's ban was eventually reduced to one season.

|}

Group stage

11 teams of 16 made their debut in the UEFA Champions League group stage: Aalborg BK, Blackburn Rovers, Borussia Dortmund, Ferencváros, Grasshopper, Juventus, Legia Warsaw, Nantes, Panathinaikos, Real Madrid and Rosenborg. Panathinaikos had already played in the group stage of the 1991–92 European Cup. Aalborg, Ferencvaros, Grasshopper, Legia and Rosenborg were the first teams to play in group stage from Denmark, Hungary, Switzerland, Poland and Norway respectively.

Group A

Group B

Group C

Group D

Knockout stage

Bracket

Quarter-finals

|}

Semi-finals

|}

Final

Top goalscorers

See also
1995–96 UEFA Cup Winners' Cup
1995–96 UEFA Cup
1995 UEFA Intertoto Cup

References

External links

1995–96 All matches – season at UEFA website
 European Cup results at RSSSF
 All scorers 1995–96 UEFA Champions League (excluding qualifying round) according to protocols UEFA + all scorers qualifying round
 1995/96 UEFA Champions League – results and line-ups (archive)

 
1
1995-96